Joseph Howard Witheford (1848 – 30 October 1931) was a Liberal Party Member of Parliament in Auckland, New Zealand.

Biography
He was born in Bromsgrove, Worcestershire, England, in 1848.

Witheford was elected to the City of Auckland electorate in a by-election on 27 April 1900, and held his electorate to 1905. In that year, the multi-member electorate was replaced by several single-member electorates, and Witheford retired from parliament.

Witheford served as mayor of Birkenhead from 1901 to 1905.

He died on 30 October 1931 and was buried in the Anglican section of Pompallier Cemetery, Birkenhead.

References

1848 births
1931 deaths
New Zealand Liberal Party MPs
Mayors of places in the Auckland Region
Members of the New Zealand House of Representatives
New Zealand MPs for Auckland electorates
People from Bromsgrove
English emigrants to New Zealand
19th-century New Zealand politicians
Auckland Harbour Board members